Forrest Thomas is the name of:

 Forrest (singer) (1953–2013), American pop singer, based in the Netherlands
Frosty Thomas (1881–1970), baseball player
 Thomas Forrest Cumming (1842–1918), Australian sheep breeder and Legislative Council for Western Province

See also
Forest Yeo-Thomas
Thomas Forrest (disambiguation)